Rodrigo Valdez (February 22, 1946 – March 15, 2017) was a Colombian professional boxer who competed from 1963 to 1980. He was a two time middleweight champion, having held the WBC title from 1974 to 1976 and the undisputed WBA, WBC, and ''The Ring titles from 1977 to 1978. His rivalry with Carlos Monzón has long been considered among the most legendary boxing rivalries. Valdez was trained by International Boxing Hall of Fame coach Gil Clancy. Many people consider him, Antonio Cervantes and Miguel "Happy" Lora to be the three greatest boxers ever to come from that country. He is 29th on Ring Magazine's list of 100 greatest punchers of all time.

Professional boxing career
Born in Bolívar, Colombia, Rodrigo Valdez began his professional boxing career with a win over Orlando Pineda in a four-round decision on October 25, 1963, at Cartagena. He won his next eight bouts, but on October 2, 1965, he lost his undefeated record, beaten by knockout in six by Rudy Escobar.

After that defeat, he went on another undefeated streak of fifteen fights, of which he won thirteen and tied two. However, on his first fight abroad, February 16, 1969, in Ecuador, he lost a ten-round decision to Daniel Guanin. After one more fight in Cartagena, he moved to the United States. Trying to gain more recognition, he campaigned, from 1969 to 1970, in the states of New York, Nevada and California, winning seven fights and losing two. Then, he returned to South America for four more fights in his homeland, winning all.

Hepatitis
In his next match, held at the Madison Square Garden in New York City, with Bobby Cassidy on August 9, 1971, Valdez won by knockout in round six, because the fight doctor deemed Cassidy not fit to continue from a cut around his eye which had been ruled as produced by a Valdez punch. At the time, nobody knew that Cassidy had hepatitis A. As a consequence of this, Valdez also became affected by the disease. Given a quarantine, he refused to quit boxing periodically and continued training during his time of illness. Separated from most of the world, he was fit enough to win two more fights within three months of his initial diagnosis of hepatitis.

Valdez had nineteen wins in a row when he met Philadelphia legend Bennie Briscoe for the NABF middleweight title, in Nouméa, New Caledonia, on September 1, 1973, beating Briscoe in a 12-round decision to capture the regional championship and becoming a world-ranked middleweight contender. After this win, Valdez claimed for a world title shot at Monzon.

World title
He won two more fights, and the WBC made him its number one contender at Monzon's title. But Monzon did not feel like fighting the Colombian at that moment, so the WBC stripped Monzon of the world title (Monzon retained the WBA title) and made Valdez and Briscoe rematch, this time with the WBC world middleweight title on the line. On May 25, 1974, at Monte Carlo, Valdez became a world champion for the first time, by knocking Briscoe out in seven rounds. Valdez subsequently retained his title against Rudy Valdez, Gratien Tonna, and Max Cohen, until Monzon finally agreed to meet him.

One week before the long-awaited match-up, on June 19, 1976, Valdez's brother was murdered during a barroom fight in Colombia. Already in Monte Carlo for the fight, Valdez wanted to pull out of it to join his family in mourning. But he was contractually bound to fight Monzon, so he had to stay in Europe, and on June 26, Valdez, who to many observers seemed rather uninterested, lost in the unification bout to Monzon in a 15-round unanimous decision. Valdez won two more fights after returning to Colombia.

The WBA and WBC, recognizing that Valdez probably wasn't in the best of moods to fight during his first confrontation with Monzon, ordered a second fight between the rivals, and so they fought again, on July 30, 1977, once again at Monte Carlo. This time around, Valdez knocked down Monzon in the second round, becoming the only man to send the Argentine to the floor in Monzon's long career. Valdez was leading after seven rounds, but Monzon mounted a late rally that allowed him to keep the title by a close decision.

Monzon's retirement
Monzon announced his retirement from boxing afterwards, and so Valdez and Briscoe were matched once again, on November 5, 1977, for the vacant undisputed world middleweight championship, in Campione d'Italia, which belonged back then not to Italy, but actually to Switzerland. Valdez recovered the world middleweight championship, with a 15-round decision over Briscoe. This time around, however, he would lose his title on his first defense, on April 22, 1978, by points in 15 rounds to another Argentine, Hugo Corro, in San Remo, Italy.

On November 11 of that same year, they had a rematch, at Buenos Aires' Luna Park Stadium, and Corro repeated his 15-round victory to retain the world title.

Retirement
Valdez fought only twice more, winning both fights by knockout. After beating Gilberto Amonte on November 28, 1980, in the first round, he retired from boxing for good.

Valdez had a record of 63 wins, eight losses and two draws as a professional boxer, with 42 wins by knockout.

Death
According to Colombian sources, Valdez died of a massive heart attack on March 14, 2017. Cartagena mayor Manuel Duque confirmed the two time former world champion's death, calling him "one of the greatest Colombian sportsmen of all time".

Professional boxing record

See also
Afro-Colombians
WBC Legends of Boxing Museum
List of world middleweight boxing champions

References

External links

Rodrigo Valdez - CBZ Profile

 

|-

|-

|-

1946 births
2017 deaths
Colombian male boxers
Sportspeople from Cartagena, Colombia
Middleweight boxers
World Boxing Association champions
World Boxing Council champions
The Ring (magazine) champions
World middleweight boxing champions